The following is a list of the forty largest employers in the Columbus MSA as of 2016.  Asterisks denote companies headquartered locally.

Below is a list of the largest employers in the Columbus MSA as of 2004.

References
Major Employers in Columbus (2016 archive) 
Columbus Chamber of Commerce 
Columbus Chamber of Commerce Home Page

 
 
United States-related lists of superlatives
Employers
Columbus, Ohio-related lists